The Duck Pond Mine is an underground Canadian copper and zinc mine that was owned and operated by Teck Resources  south of Millertown in Newfoundland, Canada. It closed operations in July 2015.

The mine was owned by Aur Resources until Aur was taken over by Teck in 2007. The property was originally optioned by Thundermin Resources from Noranda. Thundermin partnered with Queenston Mining to develop the project in 2001. Noranda had originally planned to develop the site in 1988 but the conditions were not economically feasible.

During operations, the mine employed 270 workers in two shifts.

The semi-autogenous grinding (SAG) mill at the mine processed 1800 tpd. Further processing included a ball mill and flotation circuit.

See also
List of copper mines in Canada
Mount Polley mine
Highland Valley Copper mine
New Afton mine
Gibraltar Mine

References

Copper mines in Canada
Zinc mines in Canada
Mines in Newfoundland and Labrador
Teck Resources